This list of fictional reptiles is subsidiary to the list of fictional animals and is a collection of various notable reptilian characters that appear in various works of fiction. It is limited to well-referenced examples of reptiles in literature, film, television, comics, animation, video games and mythology, organized by species.

Crocodiles and alligators

Dinosaurs

Snakes

Turtles

Lizards

See also
List of reptilian humanoids

References

 Reptile